Schisandra, the magnolia vines, is a genus of twining shrubs that generally climb on other vegetation. Various authors have included the plants in the Illiciaceae

Schisandra (also spelled Schizandra) is native to Asia and North America, with a center of diversity in China.

Some species are commonly grown in gardens as ornamentals. It is a hardy deciduous climber which thrives in almost any kind of soil; its preferred position is on a sheltered, shady wall. It may be propagated by cuttings of half-matured shoots in August.

Despite its common name "magnolia vine", Schisandra is not closely related to the true magnolias.

Uses
Its dried fruit is sometimes used medicinally. The berries of S. chinensis are given the name wu wei zi in Chinese (五味子; pinyin: wǔ wèi zi), which translates as "five flavor fruit" because they possess all five basic flavors in Chinese herbal medicine: salty, sweet, sour, pungent (spicy), and bitter. In traditional Chinese medicine it is used as a remedy for many ailments: to resist infections, increase skin health, and combat insomnia, coughing, and thirst.

Species
accepted species

Chemistry 
The extract of S. rubriflora, a native of the Yunnan province, was found to contain complex and highly oxygenated nortriterpenoids called rubriflorins A-C.

See also 

 Schisandra chinensis
 Kadsura japonica

References

External links 
 Schisandraceae [sensu stricto] in the Flora of North America

 
Angiosperm genera
Medicinal plants
Taxa named by André Michaux